Wojciech Wojda (28 December 1966) is a Polish singer from Płock, Poland. He is the founder and lead singer of the band Farben Lehre. Since 2004, he has been the promoter of Punky Reggae Live.

References

1966 births
Living people
People from Płock
Polish reggae singers
Polish rock singers
20th-century Polish male singers
21st-century Polish male singers
21st-century Polish singers